is a 1998 shoot 'em up video game developed and published by Hudson Soft (Electro Brain for the North American release) for the Nintendo 64, a direct sequel to Soldier Blade and is part of this Star Soldier series. There was also an arcade version released for Seta's Aleck 64, arcade hardware similar to the Nintendo 64.

Gameplay 

Star Soldier: Vanishing Earth is a science fiction-themed vertically scrolling shoot 'em up game.

Reception 

IGN gave Star Soldier: Vanishing Earth 5.0 out of 10 overall stating the gameplay was "okay, but has little variety and little innovation". Nintendo Power gave Star Soldier: Vanishing Earth a 7.2/10, stating "This game is as simple as it gets. If you can see it on the screen, you can shoot it, or it can shoot you. Blast, dodge, collect power-ups. That's it."

Notes

References

External links 
 
 Star Soldier: Vanishing Earth at GameFAQs
 Star Soldier: Vanishing Earth at Killer List of Videogames
 Star Soldier: Vanishing Earth at MobyGames

1998 video games
Arcade video games
Electro Brain games
Nintendo 64 games
SETA Corporation games
Single-player video games
Star Soldier
Video games developed in Japan